Crittendenceratops (meaning "horned face from the Fort Crittenden Formation") is a genus of horned centrosaurine ceratopsid dinosaur from the late Campanian Fort Crittenden Formation of Arizona. It contains a single species, C. krzyzanowskii, and represents the first species of dinosaur from the Fort Crittenden Formation to receive a formal scientific name.

Description

Crittendenceratops is distinguished by forward-curving, hook-like flanges located along the central portion of the top of the frill, "extensive" epiparietals located along the sides of the parietal portion of the frill, a thickening of the frill in the parietal portion, and a short, pronounced ridge on the surface of the squamosal portion of the frill.

Classification
Crittendenceratops was assigned to the Nasutoceratopsini (which also includes Avaceratops, Nasutoceratops, and Yehuecauhceratops), a tribe of the ceratopsid subfamily Centrosaurinae, by Dalman et al. (2018). The cladogram below follows their phylogenetic analysis:

See also
 Timeline of ceratopsian research
2018 in archosaur paleontology

References

Centrosaurines
Campanian genus first appearances
Campanian genus extinctions
Late Cretaceous dinosaurs of North America
Fossil taxa described in 2018
Ornithischian genera